Jean-Pierre Kotta (born 3 May 1956) is a Central African basketball player. He was a member of the Central African Republic national basketball team at the 1988 Summer Olympics.

References

1956 births
Living people
Basketball players at the 1988 Summer Olympics
Central African Republic men's basketball players
Olympic basketball players of the Central African Republic